Trinity College may refer to:

Australia
 Trinity Catholic College, Auburn, a coeducational school in the inner-western suburbs of Sydney, New South Wales
 Trinity Catholic College, Goulburn, a coeducational school in the Southern Tablelands, New South Wales
 Trinity Catholic College, Lismore, a coeducational school in northeastern New South Wales
 Trinity College Queensland, a theological college of the Uniting Church in Australia, in Auchenflower, Brisbane
 Trinity College, Beenleigh, a Roman Catholic coeducational school in Queensland
 Trinity College, Gawler, a coeducational multi-school college in South Australia
 Trinity College, Melbourne, a residential college of the university of Melbourne
 Trinity College, Perth, a Roman Catholic boys' school in Western Australia
 Trinity Lutheran College (Queensland), a coeducational school in Ashmore, on the Gold Coast
 Trinity Residential College, a residential college of the University of Western Australia in Perth
 Trinity Theological College, Perth, an evangelical Christian college in Western Australia

Canada
 Trinity College, Toronto, a federated college of the University of Toronto, in Ontario
 Trinity College School, in Port Hope, Ontario
 Trinity Western College, former name of Trinity Western University in Langley, British Columbia

Ireland
 Trinity College Dublin, the sole constituent college of the University of Dublin

New Zealand
 Trinity Catholic College, Dunedin, a school in Dunedin, New Zealand

United Kingdom
In the UK, Trinity College is generally used as a term to refer to the colleges at one of the English ancient universities:

 Trinity College, Cambridge, a constituent college of the University of Cambridge
 Trinity College, Oxford, a constituent college of the University of Oxford

It may also refer to:
 Trinity College, Bristol, an Anglican theological college
 Trinity College, Carmarthen, former name of Trinity University College, now merged into the University of Wales Trinity Saint David
 Trinity College, Glasgow, a Church of Scotland institution within the University of Glasgow supervising candidates for ministry
 Trinity College, Glenalmond, former name of Glenalmond College in Perthshire
 Trinity College London, an examination board formerly associated with Trinity College of Music
 Trinity College Kirk, also known as Trinity College Church, the remnants of a medieval collegiate foundation in Edinburgh
 Trinity College of Music, in Greenwich, Greater London, now merged into Trinity Laban Conservatoire of Music and Dance
 Trinity Catholic College, Middlesbrough, a school in North Yorkshire

United States
 Trinity Baptist College, in Jacksonville, Florida
 Trinity Bible College and Graduate School, in Ellendale, North Dakota
 Trinity Christian College, in Palos Heights, Illinois
 Trinity College and University, former name of Bronte International University, previously based in South Dakota
 Trinity College (Connecticut), a liberal arts college in Hartford
 Trinity College of Arts and Sciences in Durham, North Carolina; Duke University's undergraduate liberal arts college ("Trinity College" was the former name of the entire university)
 Trinity College of the Bible and Theological Seminary, in Newburgh, Indiana
 Trinity College of Florida, a Bible college in New Port Richey
 Trinity College of Vermont, formerly a women's college in Burlington
 Trinity College, former name of Trinity Washington University in Washington, D.C.
 Trinity College, the undergraduate school of Trinity International University, Deerfield, Illinois
 Trinity College, in Miami, Florida, now merged into Trinity International University as its Florida campus
 Trinity Lutheran College (Washington), in Seattle
 Trinity School (Athens, Alabama), a historical school for African Americans

Other locations
 Trinity College and University, former name of Bronte International University, based in Tortola, British Virgin Islands
 Trinity College Foochow, the precursor of Fuzhou Foreign Language School, in Fujian, China
 Trinity College Nabbingo, a secondary school in the Central Region of Uganda
 Trinity College of Quezon City, former name of Trinity University of Asia in the Philippines
 Trinity College Rancagua, a high school in Cachapoal Province, Chile
 Trinity College Rome Campus, in Italy, an overseas residential programme of the Trinity College in Connecticut, U.S.
 Trinity College, Kandy, a secondary school in Sri Lanka
 Trinity College, Leuven, formerly a college of the old University of Leuven, in Brabant, modern-day Belgium
 Trinity College, Moka, a secondary school in Maraval, Trinidad and Tobago
 Trinity Theological College, Singapore, an ecumenical Christian college
 Trinity International College, a college in Kathmandu, Nepal

See also
 Holy Trinity College (disambiguation)
 Trinity Hall (disambiguation)
 Trinity High School (disambiguation)
 Trinity School (disambiguation)
 Trinity University (disambiguation)
 Trinity Seminary (disambiguation)